Rémy Card is a French software developer who is credited as one of the primary developers of the Extended file system (ext) and Second Extended file system (ext2) for Linux.

References

Bibliography
 Card, Rémy. (1997) Programmation Linux 2.0. Gestion 2000. .
 Card, Rémy; Dumas, Éric; & Mével, Franck. (1998). The Linux Kernel Book. John Wiley & Sons. .

External links
 Design and Implementation of the Second Extended Filesystem - written by Rémy Card, Theodore Ts'o and Stephen Tweedie, published at the First Dutch International Symposium on Linux (December 1994)
 Rémy Card Interview - in French (April 1998)

French computer programmers
Free software programmers
Linux kernel programmers
Year of birth missing (living people)
Living people
Academic staff of Versailles Saint-Quentin-en-Yvelines University